The Mygale SJ97 is an open-wheel formula race car chassis, designed, developed, and built by French manufacturer and race car constructor Mygale, for Formula Ford race categories, in 1997.

References 

Open wheel racing cars
Formula Ford cars